Daniel Miller Tenenbaum (or Tennenbaum, born 19 April 1995), sometimes known as just Daniel, is a Brazilian footballer who plays for Maccabi Tel Aviv as a goalkeeper.

Early life
Tenenbaum was born in Rio de Janeiro, Brazil, to a family of Ashkenazi Jewish descent. He had his Bar Mitzvah in Israel. He served as a soldier in the Israel Defense Forces.

Club career
Born in Rio de Janeiro, Tenenbaum joined Flamengo's youth setup in 2011, aged 15, after already playing futsal and rowing for the club. He was promoted to the main squad in 2014 by manager Vanderlei Luxemburgo.

On 7 December 2014 Tenenbaum made his first team – and Série A – debut on 7 December 2014, coming on as a second-half substitute for field player Arthur in a 1–1 away draw against Grêmio as goalkeeper César was sent off.

On 31 August 2016, Tenenbaum has been loaned to Israeli club Maccabi Tel Aviv.

After setting an Israeli Premier League clean sheet record of 14 consecutive clean-sheets, Tenenbaum conceded a goal in the ninth minute of the 1–1 draw with Nes Ziona, the first goal he conceded in the 2019 Israeli Premier League season. This goal ended a 1,273 minutes run without conceding a goal, being this, the seventh best clean-sheet run in top-flight football worldwide.

Honours

Club

Maccabi Tel Aviv
 Israeli Premier League (2): 2018–19, 2019-20
 Toto Cup (3): 2017–18, 2018–19, 2020-21
 Israel Super Cup (2): 2019, 2020

See also 

 List of Jewish footballers
 List of Jews in sports
 List of Israelis

References

External links
Flamengo official profile 
Daniel Tenenbaum at playmakerstats.com (English version of ogol.com.br)

1995 births
Living people
Brazilian Ashkenazi Jews
Israeli Ashkenazi Jews
Brazilian footballers
Israeli footballers
CR Flamengo footballers
Maccabi Tel Aviv F.C. players
Israeli Premier League players
Campeonato Brasileiro Série A players
Association football goalkeepers
Brazilian emigrants to Israel
Footballers from Rio de Janeiro (city)